Bodla is a surname. Notable people with the surname include:

 Aslam Bodla (born 1952), Pakistani politician
 Saeed Ahmad Bodla, Pakistani artist and calligrapher